Eppa Hunton (January 30, 1789 – April 8, 1830) was an American planter, military officer, and politician.

Early life and family

Childhood
Hunton was born on January 30, 1789, at "Fairview" in Fauquier County, Virginia, the second of eight children of Hannah Logan (née Brown) and James Hunton.

Marriage
Hunton married the former Elizabeth Marye Brent on June 22, 1811. The couple had eleven children: Virginia, Hannah, John, Judith, Silas, James, Eppa, Elizabeth, George, Mary, and Charles.

Death
Hunton died at his home, "Mount Hope", near New Baltimore, Virginia, on April 8, 1830, and was buried in the family cemetery on the property.

References

External links

1789 births
1830 deaths
American slave owners
19th-century American politicians